Bettna is a locality situated in Flen Municipality, Södermanland County, Sweden with 412 inhabitants in 2010. It is also a parish with the same name.

The boundary goes a few hundred metres from the village entrance by national road 52. The topography around the village is generally flat with occasional rolling hills and little elevation is covered when travelling to either of the three nearby municipal centres. Bettna is also adjacent to the lake Yngaren and also has other lakes in its vicinity.

The oldest part of the church was built in the 12th century. Its organ was approved by the Swedish king Gustaf III shortly before his assassination in 1792. The organ was reconstructed in 1988.

The Swedish post-impressionist painter Nils von Dardel was born in Bettna in 1888.

Riksdag elections 
The village of Bettna proper forms a district with the smaller village of Vadsbro to its north and the surrounding agrarian and forested lands. It has been voting for the opposite centre-right coalitions in every election of the unicameral era compared to the municipal seat of Flen and the municipality as a whole.

References 

Populated places in Södermanland County
Populated places in Flen Municipality